Brother José (Joseph) Muñoz Cortés (a privately tonsure monk Ambrose; 13 May 1948, in Santiago, Chile – 30/31 October 1997, in Athens, Greece) was an Orthodox monk, and the keeper of a revered copy of the Panagia Portaitissa (Iveron Icon), in Montreal, Canada.

Early life
Muñoz was born in Chile into a pious Roman Catholic family of Spanish descent. When Muñoz was 12, he became acquainted with local Archbishop Leontius (Filippovich), and under his influence Muñoz was baptized into the Russian Orthodox Church Outside Russia two years later, with his mother's consent.

Death

In October 1997, during one of his trips with the icon, Muñoz was tortured and murdered in a hotel room in Athens, Greece during the overnight hours of October 30 or 31. The icon was stolen, and has not been seen since. Muñoz had planned to return to Canada the following day to celebrate the fifteenth anniversary of the appearance of the miraculous myrrh on the icon.

Aftermath
Nicoulai Ciaru, a Romanian, was accused of the murder, and appeared in court on November 18, 1998 in Athens, Greece. The judicial process continued to November 23rd, and Ciaru was acquitted, due to the lack of evidence.

See also
Panagia Portaitissa
Mother of God
Panagia

References

External links
José Muñoz-Cortes - The Chosen One of the Mother of God: Collection of Materials and Witnesses in English
God's servant. Film about brother Joseph Jose Muñoz. 2005 year (on Russian)
Hermano José (Muñoz), Guardián del Icono Miróforo de Montreal (on Spanish)
Brother Joseph (José) Muñoz- Cortes. The Biography of a Martyr
https://web.archive.org/web/20081106075331/http://www.yalchicago.org/Portaitissa_Miracle_Icon.html
http://www.orthodoxhawaii.org/icons.html
http://www.annball.com/books/ofm7-2.shtml
https://web.archive.org/web/20081206174857/http://www.stjohndc.org/Russian/munoz/e_official/e_9806e.HTM

1948 births
Chilean people of Spanish descent
Eastern Orthodox Christians from Chile
Members of the Russian Orthodox Church
Converts to Eastern Orthodoxy from Roman Catholicism
Chilean expatriates in Greece
Eastern Orthodox monks
Academic staff of the Université de Montréal
Icon painters
1997 deaths